Kapit is a village in the municipality of Medveđa, Serbia. According to the 2002 census, the village has a population of 253 people. Of these, 245 (96,83 %) were ethnic Albanians, 6 (2,37 %) were Serbs, and 2 (0,79 %) others.

References

Populated places in Jablanica District
Albanian communities in Serbia